Niklas Urban Eriksson (born February 17, 1969) is a Swedish former professional ice hockey player, continuing as an ice hockey coach. He won a gold medal at the 1994 Winter Olympics. Eriksson played most of his years in Leksands IF, and has also represented IFK Helsingfors (Finland) and HC Pustertal Wölfe (Italy). With 721 games for Leksands IF Eriksson is the player with most games for the club, and as of 2019 Eriksson is one of the honored players with jersey number 16 up in the ceiling of Tegera Arena.

After ending his career as a player in 2008 Eriksson continued as a coach. After coaching Leksands IF Eriksson has coached Lillehammer IK (Norway) and Almtuna IS. He is since 2018 Head Coach for Örebro HK.

Career statistics

Regular season and playoffs

International

References

External links

1969 births
Brunico SG players
HIFK (ice hockey) players
Ice hockey players at the 1994 Winter Olympics
Leksands IF players
Living people
Medalists at the 1994 Winter Olympics
Olympic gold medalists for Sweden
Olympic medalists in ice hockey
People from Västervik Municipality
Philadelphia Flyers draft picks
Swedish ice hockey right wingers
Sportspeople from Kalmar County
Örebro HK coaches
Swedish Hockey League coaches